Michael Lorenzo Roberts (born May 7, 1994) is a former American football tight end. He played collegiate football at Toledo.

Professional career

Detroit Lions
The Detroit Lions selected Roberts in the fourth round (127th overall) of the 2017 NFL Draft.

On May 12, 2017, the Lions signed Roberts to a four-year, $3.00 million contract with a signing bonus of $603,136. In Week 4, against the Minnesota Vikings, he recorded his first career catch, a 15-yard reception.

In 2018, Roberts played in eight games with two starts, recording nine catches for 100 yards and three touchdowns. He was placed on injured reserve on December 11, 2018 with a shoulder injury.

On June 13, 2019, the Lions agreed to trade Roberts to the New England Patriots for a 2020 conditional seventh-round pick. Two days later, the trade was voided before becoming official, and Roberts was subsequently waived by the Lions.

Green Bay Packers
On June 17, 2019, Roberts was claimed off waivers by the Green Bay Packers, but was waived two days later after failing his physical.

Miami Dolphins
On February 19, 2020, Roberts was signed by the Miami Dolphins. He was waived with a non-football injury designation on July 27, 2020.

References

1994 births
Living people
Players of American football from Cleveland
American football tight ends
Toledo Rockets football players
Detroit Lions players
Green Bay Packers players
Miami Dolphins players